Play Me a Love Song is a Croatian comedy film directed by Goran Kulenović. It was released in 2007.

Cast
 Ivan Herceg - Struja
 Ivan Đuričić - Mario
 Ivan Glowatzky - Deni
 Hrvoje Kečkeš - Zlajfa
 Enes Vejzović - Sinisa
 Olga Pakalović - Anja
 Žarko Potočnjak - Strujin stari
 Helena Buljan - Strujina mama
 Damir Lončar - Božo
 Ksenija Marinković - Emica
 Robert Ugrina - Kum
 Hana Hegedušić - Djurdjica
 Stojan Matavulj - Ante
 Biserka Ipša - Andjela
 Zdenka Heršak - Gospodja Hrnjak
 Josip Marotti - Gospodin Hrnjak

External links
 

2007 films
2000s Croatian-language films
2007 comedy films
Films set in Zagreb
Croatian comedy films